The A17 road is a mostly single carriageway road linking Newark-on-Trent in Nottinghamshire, England, to King's Lynn in Norfolk. It stretches for a distance of 62 miles travelling across the flat fen landscapes of southern Lincolnshire and western Norfolk and links the East Midlands with East Anglia. The road is notable for its numerous roundabouts and notoriously dangerous staggered junctions and also for its most famous landmark, the Cross Keys Bridge at Sutton Bridge close to the Lincolnshire/Cambridgeshire/Norfolk borders which carries the road over the River Nene.

Usage 

The A17 is a major route for large goods vehicles (LGV) accessing Lincolnshire and Norfolk from northern England and the Midlands and is also a major holiday route particularly in the summer months for cars and caravans making their way from the north of England to East Anglian seaside resorts of Hunstanton, Wells-next-the-Sea, Sheringham, Cromer and Great Yarmouth as it one of only two direct routes which link Norfolk with the A1, the other being the A47. In addition, there are several stretches of dual carriageway at junctions. It is one of two main routes for residents of East Anglia to get to the north of England (and vice versa). The other is the A47 via Peterborough, which is a longer route but has more dual carriageway, particularly around Peterborough, though it too remains mostly single carriageway.

The A17 was formerly a trunk road, but was reclassified as a principal road (maintained by the local authority) in 2002. The A47 retains trunk road status as far as its junction with the A1.

Hazards 
The road carries more traffic than it was designed to carry. It also carries many goods vehicles that must travel at or below  on the stretches of single carriageway. Impatient drivers take risks when gaps in the oncoming traffic allow. In the summer there are many caravans travelling to Great Yarmouth and the north Norfolk coast. The main meeting points at the roundabouts of the A52, A15, and A16 routinely cause long queues. The section through South Holland is also heavily used by tractors.

History 
The western end of the road formerly began at the former A46 junction in Newark-on-Trent where Queens Road met North Gate (former A46). It then followed Sleaford Road and Beacon Hill Road, meeting the A1 and passing through Coddington as Beckingham Road then Sleaford Lane. On the former section in Newark, when the Beacon Hill Bridge over the East Coast Main Line was replaced, the explosion to demolish the old bridge on 12 November 1961 put four construction workers in hospital.

The Route

Winthorpe to Sleaford

The western end begins in Winthorpe, Nottinghamshire, on the eastern side of the Newark bypass, where it meets the A46 at a roundabout, with access to the A1. This section passes over the former RAF Winthorpe (now Newark Air Museum, and there is a roundabout for Newlink Business Park. It meets the former route from Coddington at the Coddington Moor roundabout]. From College Plantation to Beckingham Bridge over the River Witham, the road follows the boundary between Lincolnshire (to the north) and Nottinghamshire (to the south), slightly to the north. The road also enters North Kesteven. It crosses the River Witham as part of the dual-carriageway Beckingham Bypass which was built in 1972 at a cost of £600,000, where there is a left turn for Carlton-le-Moorland. It returns to its former route and passes cross-roads for access to Brant Broughton and Stragglethorpe. This is one of the most accident-prone junctions in Lincolnshire. It passes across Leadenham Low Fields, with the Lincoln Cliff seen in the distance.

Leadenham is built on the side of the Lincoln Cliff, which the road no longer passes through, which gives access to the A607. In March 1995, the £3.3 million bypass was opened and the route passes through Leadenham Park to the south of the village. It ascends the Lincoln Cliff as a three lane road (2+1 road), and passes under the A607 where there is no junction. The Leadenham Bypass had been planned for over thirty years, and had started out as a dual carriageway which would have been the safest option (but more expensive) for the amount of traffic that the road carries. At the point where it crosses the former Grantham to Lincoln Line, it enters South Kesteven, at Fulbeck. There is an embankment as it ascends the rest of the Lincoln Cliff at Fulbeck Hilltop Plantation, and follows a former country lane east of Fulbeck. It meets the former route (with access for Pottergate Road to Wellingore, and the A607) and passes across Fulbeck Heath.

At Cranwell and Byard's Leap, it re-enters North Kesteven at the line of the north–south Ermine Street (now the Viking Way). The road used to briefly follow Ermine Street southwards to Byard's Leap with its cafe, and then eastwards to the current route at the B1429 junction. The road now passes slightly further to the north, with a right turn for the B6403, and a left turn for the B1429 for RAF Cranwell. In North Rauceby, it passes along the southern edge of the airfield. There is a crossroads for Cranwell, to the left, and North Rauceby, to the south.

Sleaford to Swineshead

The A17 meets the north–south A15 at the Holdingham Roundabout, near the Jolly Scotchman (on the B1518 – the former route). There is the Sleaford Little Chef, the Sleaford Travelodge, and the TOTAL Holdingham Service Station. On the former route to Sleaford there is a McDonald's and the Texaco Hockmeyer Motors. Sleaford was bypassed by the A17 on 27 March 1975, when opened by Joseph Godber. The section from the A15 to the A153 had earlier been opened on 14 November 1973. It is the only substantial section of dual-carriageway on the route, and the main opportunity to overtake caravans and lorries. There is the grade-separated Bone Mill Junction with the A153, which shares the route from Holdingham, and the B1517 for Sleaford. It crosses the Peterborough to Lincoln Line, then the River Slea and the Spires and Steeples Trail. East of here to the road's eastern terminus, the landscape is flat. At Kirkby la Thorpe it meets the former route from Sleaford, near the Queens Head. The former route has a 13 ft 9in low (railway) Boston Road Bridge, another important reason for building the bypass. From here to Swineshead, the road follows the railway from Sleaford to Boston. There is a left turn for Asgarby, and a right turn for Burton Pedwardine.

At Heckington, the £2.5 million  bypass was opened on 14 December 1982 by Lynda Chalker, Baroness Chalker of Wallasey. The former route is the B1394, and meets the A17 east of the village at the point where it is crossed by a 400 kV pylon line. A mile east of Heckington, it crosses the Car Dyke. There is a left turn for the B1395, for South Kyme, and the road forms the parish boundary between Heckington and Great Hale until the district boundary. At the Holland Dike, it enters the borough of Boston (the former Kesteven/Holland boundary).

At Swineshead Bridge there is a left turn for the A1121, for Boston, and the road is crossed by the Poacher Line at a level crossing next to the Barge Inn and Swineshead railway station. Swineshead was bypassed in 1985, and the former route leaves at the High Bridge Junction], passing The Ivy farm shop, which is sister to the Manor Farm Shop.

Swineshead to Long Sutton
At Bicker, it meets the A52 at the Bicker Bar Roundabout, next to the Texaco Bicker Bar Service Station and Supreme Inns. The road meets its former route. At Bank House at Wigtoft, there is a right turn for the B1181, for Bicker. Wigtoft itself is bypassed, to the south, by the £4.4 million  Wigtoft-Sutterton Bypass, which opened in July 1995. At Sutterton, on the bypass, it meets the B1397 Spalding Road at staggered crossroads, for Gosberton, and Sutterton, which is the former A16 (Spalding to Boston). At Sutterton Roundabout, near Algarkirk, it meets the A16, which is built on the former Lincolnshire Loop Line, and there is the BP Service Station and Sutterton Little Chef on the left hand side.

It passes Fosdyke to the west, where it crosses the River Welland at Fosdyke Bridge, entering the district of South Holland a few hundred yards south of the bridge near the Ship Inn. This was built as a swing bridge in 1911 but replaced in 1989 with the current fixed span. The loss of swing stranded the coaster, JonSue, on the landward side. In March 1991 the ship was holed and sank when, on a falling tide, she settled on a dislodged limestone boulder used to reinforce the Welland channel and was cut up on site later the same year. The Macmillan Way crosses the river via this bridge also. At Moulton, there is a right turn for the B1357 for Moulton Seas End. At Whaplode as Washway Road, it passes Saracen's Head. At this point the former road passed through Saracen's Head, Holbeach and Fleet Hargate. The bypass, New Washway Road from Saracen's Head to Laurel Lodge Farm, opened in 1989. It meets the A151 on a newly built £5.4 million roundabout which opened in December 2017, and there is also a roundabout for the B1168 (the former route through Holbeach). At Fleet it passes a Hawker Hunter installed near the road, and meets the B1515, the former route from Holbeach, west of Fleet Hargate. At Gedney it meets the former route, with St Mary Magdalene Church, Gedney seen to the south.

Long Sutton to King’s Lynn

The A17 meets the B1359 (for Gedney Drove End) at a roundabout. The Long Sutton-Sutton Bridge bypass was opened in 1989. It passes Long Sutton, Little Sutton and Sutton Bridge. It meets the B1390, for Sutton St James, at a roundabout. It meets the B1359 (for Long Sutton), and the A1101, for Wisbech, at a roundabout. There are two roundabouts where it changes direction abruptly and crosses the Cross Keys swing bridge over the River Nene at Sutton Bridge. This bridge retains its swing function necessary for access to Wisbech port for pleasure craft and small coasters. It was constructed as a shared road/rail bridge with the single line rail crossing on the west side. With the closure of the line the A17 was increased to two lanes but this bridge remains a congestion point to this day. To the south is the Sutton Bridge Power Station which is a major landmark along the route and following the river North for half a mile is the port of Sutton Bridge. Just east of the bridge the turning to the left provides access to the "Sir Peter Scott Walk" coastal path and "Snowgoose Trust" bird sanctuary.

The road follows an embankment close to the edge of The Wash, and at Walpole Cross Keys it enters Norfolk and the district of King's Lynn and West Norfolk. The £3.14 million  West of Kings Lynn – County Boundary section was opened on 14 December 1982 by Lynda Chalker, Baroness Chalker of Wallasey. In Terrington St Clement, there is a crossroads at Balsam Field, for Tilney High End to the right, at which there is the African Violet Centre with a cafe. From this point all the way to the A47 junction, the road is the parish boundary between Clenchwarton to the north, and Tilney All Saints to the south. The former route passed through Terrington St Clement, Clenchwarton and West Lynn. The improved follows the former Spalding to South Lynn, part of the Midland and Great Northern Joint Railway (M&GN), which closed on 2 March 1959. Whilst the A17 has a chequered accident record, not a single passenger was killed on this former railway. It meets the A47 at the start of the King's Lynn bypass at what's known as the "Pullover Roundabout".

Junction list

A17

References

External links 

 December 1983 House of Lords debate on the Fosdyke Bridge

Borough of Boston
Newark and Sherwood
North Kesteven District
Roads in England
Roads in Lincolnshire
Roads in Norfolk
South Holland, Lincolnshire
Transport in Nottinghamshire
Transport in Norfolk